The years of 2010 to 2014 saw LGBTQ characters premiere in various animated series, part of the decade that changed animation going forward. This included characters prominently featured in Adventure Time, My Little Pony: Friendship is Magic, Young Justice, The Awesomes, Steven Universe, RWBY, and BoJack Horseman. On the other hand, Yuri Seijin Naoko-san, Mayo Chiki!, Wandering Son, and YuruYuri were among the anime series with LGBTQ characters. These stories set the stage for those to come in the later part of the decade, 2015–2019.

This list only includes recurring characters, otherwise known as supporting characters, which appear frequently from time to time during the series' run, often playing major roles in more than one episode, and those in the main cast are listed below. LGBTQ characters which are guest stars or one-off characters are listed on the pages focusing exclusively on gay (in animation and anime), lesbian (in animation and anime), bisexual (in animation and anime), trans, pansexual, asexual, non-binary, and intersex characters.

The entries on this page are organized alphanumerically by duration dates and then alphabetically by the first letter of a specific series.

2010

2011

2012

2013

2014

See also

 List of yuri anime and manga
 List of LGBT-related films by year
 List of animated films with LGBT characters

Notes

References

Citations

Sources
 
 

2010s animated television series
2010s-related lists
Animated
Lists of animated series
 
2010s LGBT-related television series